is a public aquarium located in Sendai, Miyagi Prefecture, Japan. It opened in 2015 as a successor to the Marinepia Matsushima Aquarium, which had been open for 88 years.

Exhibits

Inherited from the Marinepia Matsushima Aquarium are Commerson's dolphins and finless porpoises, along with fish from the Sanriku region.

The facility is a two-story building with 100 fish tanks.
Inside there is a dolphin and sea lion show pool that can accommodate about 1,000 people.

Captive blue sharks 
The aquarium has a focus on rearing and exhibiting blue sharks as representative fish from Sanriku. Bred in a cylindrical tank separate from the main, large tank, most of the young sharks did not last long initially. 

In 2016, three blue sharks were captured and brought to the aquarium. In 2017 one of these, a male, broke the previous record of captivity of 244 days. The previous record was set at Tokyo Sea Life Park.

A blue shark was later captured in 2018 and survived in captivity for 873 days until it died in December 2020, significantly increasing the record. The shark was captured in Shizugawa Bay on July 27, 2018, and taken to the aquarium. The cause of death was attributed to disordered swimming due to dehydration. This growth rate was said to be the same as that of wild blue sharks.

History

Marinepia Matsushima Aquarium

 was a public aquarium in Matsushima, Miyagi. It opened on April 1, 1927, and closed on May 10, 2015, making it the second longest-running aquarium in Japan, after Uozu Aquarium.

Marinepia Matsushima Aquarium was operated by Sendai express which, in 2001, began to consider a renewal of the aquarium due to aging. Following the opening of Oga Aquarium Gao and Aquamarine Fukushima, the number of visitors to the aquarium began to decrease.

In 2009, Sendai City announced plans to relocate the aquarium to Takasago Central Park in Sendai Port. However, in February 2010, Sendai express canceled its investment in the relocation due to the lack of prospects for raising funds. Then, in 2013, six companies, including Yokohama Hakkeijima Sea Paradise, established the Sendai Aquarium Development Co., Ltd. The new company built Sendai Umino-Mori Aquarium in the hinterland of Sendai Port, where the Marinepia Matsushima Aquarium was supposed to move. Sendai express did not invest in the new aquarium, but the new aquarium accepted animals from the Marinepia aquarium.

Tōhoku earthquake and tsunami 
In 2011, the Tōhoku earthquake and tsunami caused seawater and mud to flood Marinepia Matsushima Aquarium, breaking the circulation pump. This resulted in the loss of about 5% of the aquarium's approximately 4000 animals. The aquarium received new tropical fish and jellyfish from Kamo Aquarium, Osaka Aquarium, and Kagoshima Aquarium.

Facilities

Floor (1F) 
 Welcome Hall
 The seas of Japan
1. The Submarine Forest of Sea pineapple (Maboya)
2. Sparkling of Life
3. Oyashio, Cold Current
4. Irodori, Sea of seaweed
5. Tairyo, Great Fish
6. Naiwan, Sea of Blessing
7. Amamo, Sea Cradel
8. Higate, Cultivating Sea Life
9. Shinkai, Deep Sea
10. UMINO－MORI Lab.
11. The Hirose River, the Source of Sea
UMINO-MORI Beach

Floor (2F)

 12. The Gallery for People
 13. Scene I Oceania
 14. Scene II Europe
 15. Scene III Africa
 16. Scene IV North America and South America
 17. Scene V Asia
 18. Our Mother Sea
 19. Communication Wall
 20. Jellyfish Room

The Plaza of Marine Animals (supported by Mitsui Life)

Shops

 Cabana
 Umimori shop Museum Shop
 Wakuwaku ocean Food Court

See also
Facilities with the same management:
Yokohama Hakkeijima Sea Paradise
Maxell Aqua Park Shinagawa
Itabashi Botanical Garden

References

External links
 Official Site 
 Official Site 

Animal theme parks
Aquaria in Japan
Amusement parks opened in 2015
Miyagi Prefecture 
Museums in Miyagi Prefecture